Bolibana is a village and seat of the commune of Toridaga-Ko in the Cercle of Niono in the Ségou Region of southern-central Mali. The village is 20 km north of Niono.

References

Populated places in Ségou Region